Alan Withers (20 October 1930 – 29 November 2017) was an English footballer who scored 42 goals from 240 appearances in the Football League. He played for Blackpool, Lincoln City and Notts County, before moving into non-league football. He played on the left wing.

Blackpool
Signed to Blackpool by Joe Smith on 4 July 1949, Withers made his League debut against Huddersfield Town on 18 November 1950, at inside-left, and became the first player to score a hat-trick on his First Division debut in the Seasiders 3–1 victory. He was sold to Lincoln City for £350 on 28 February 1955 and went on to score seven other hat-tricks in League football whilst playing in the Second and Third Divisions.

References
Specific

General
Gerry Wolstenholme's obituary for Alan Withers, 30 December 2017

1930 births
2017 deaths
People from Bulwell
Footballers from Nottinghamshire
English footballers
Association football wingers
Blackpool F.C. players
Lincoln City F.C. players
Notts County F.C. players
Wisbech Town F.C. players
Boston United F.C. players
Leamington F.C. players
English Football League players